A by-election was held for the New South Wales Legislative Assembly electorate of Central Cumberland on 27 June 1867 because of the resignation of John Hay who was then appointed to the Legislative Council.

Dates

Result

The by-election was caused by the resignation of John Hay who was then appointed to the Legislative Council.

See also
Electoral results for the district of Central Cumberland
List of New South Wales state by-elections

References

1867 elections in Australia
New South Wales state by-elections
1860s in New South Wales